The 1994 New York gubernatorial election was an election for the state governorship held on November 8, 1994. Incumbent Democratic Governor Mario Cuomo ran for a fourth term, but was defeated by Republican George Pataki in an upset victory. Pataki had previously been described by the New York Daily News as "a little-known Republican state senator." The conservative New York Post attributed the result to how voters "had grown tired of the 12-year incumbent Cuomo and his liberalism."

Pataki's victory was one of the most notable of the 1994 "Republican Revolution" midterm elections, which also ousted Governors in Alabama, New Mexico, and Texas. This is the last time a Governor of New York lost re-election. This would be the last gubernatorial race until 2022 that was decided by a single-digit margin.

Democratic primary

Candidates
 Mario Cuomo, incumbent Governor
 Lenora Fulani, activist and perennial candidate

Withdrawn
 Roy Innis, National Chairman of CORE

Campaign
Only two candidates announced their intention to challenge incumbent Governor Mario Cuomo in the Democratic primary: Lenora Fulani, who had been the 1990 gubernatorial nominee of the New Alliance Party and its 1988 and 1992 presidential nominee; and Roy Innis, the National Chairman of the Congress of Racial Equality. Ultimately, Innis did not submit petitions. Fulani, however, submitted petitions and made it onto the Democratic primary ballot. Fulani's bid was generally considered a losing effort with no hope of keeping the nomination away from Cuomo. Cuomo refused to debate her, Fulani made it plain that she wished to draw African-American voters away from the Democratic Party, and no elected officials endorsed Fulani except Adam Clayton Powell IV. Fulani was also far outstripped when it came to fundraising. On September 13, 1994, Cuomo handily defeated Fulani.

Results

Republican primary

Candidates
 Evan G. Galbraith, former Ambassador to France
 Herbert London, college professor, Conservative candidate for Mayor of New York City in 1989 and Conservative nominee for governor in 1990
 George Pataki, State Senator
 Richard M. Rosenbaum, former Chairman of the Republican Party of New York

Withdrawn
 J. Patrick Barrett, businessman
 Bill Green, former U.S. Representative (Withdrew – July 31, 1994 – Endorsed Richard Rosenbaum)

Declined
 Al D'Amato, U.S. Senator

Campaign
Initially, most expected U.S. Senator Al D'Amato to be the Republican and Conservative nominee for governor in 1994. D'Amato began what looked like the beginnings of a campaign in September 1993 when he attacked Cuomo's record as governor, claiming that New York had become "the taxasaurus and spendasaurus capital of the nation." However, less than a month later, D'Amato decided not to run; he, correctly, predicted that his party might take control of the U.S. Senate in the 1994 elections, which would make him chairman of the Senate Banking Committee.

After considering other potential candidates, D'Amato—in conjunction with State GOP Chairman William Powers—endorsed the candidacy of State Senator George Pataki. Pataki was perceived as a candidate who could garner the support of the party's moderate and conservative factions. Lewis Lehrman, the 1982 gubernatorial nominee who narrowly lost to Cuomo, publicly flirted with a run, but ultimately didn't mount a candidacy.

Former gubernatorial candidate Herbert London declared his candidacy on October 5, 1993. Running on a platform of tax cuts, reductions in state Medicaid and welfare payments and social conservatism, London was critical of both Cuomo and D'Amato. However, London's social conservatism and poor fundraising caused many party leaders to believe that he had no chance of defeating Cuomo.

On January 4, 1994, Evan Galbraith, a businessman from Manhattan and former ambassador to France under the Reagan Administration, decided to explore a potential gubernatorial bid. (Galbraith had also previously been a candidate for governor in 1990, but a court declared him eligible due to residency issues.) He quickly received endorsements from several notable figures, among them Henry Kissinger and William F. Buckley, Jr. Galbraith was considered by some as an alternative to London, holding similar positions but able to appeal to a larger base of voters. Galbraith formally declared his candidacy on April 29; by this time, however, most conservatives had coalesced around either London or Pataki.

Pataki formally declared his candidacy on March 14, but had been actively preparing for a campaign since the previous fall with the support of D'Amato and Powers. Senate Majority Leader Ralph Marino refused to support his nomination, angry over Pataki's association with Change – New York which had worked to prevent Marino's reelection. There was also concern over Pataki's position on the abortion issue, with organizations on both sides of the issue not being satisfied with his "middle-ground" approach.

Former U.S. Representative Bill Green declared his candidacy on March 18, hoping to become the moderate alternative to Pataki and London. Green claimed that he was conservative on fiscal issues while "sensibly compassionate" on social issues. His bid was badly damaged when Michael Long, Chairman of the Conservative Party, indicated that he did not believe that Green could receive Conservative support.

Former State Party Chairman Richard Rosenbaum declared his candidacy on March 23. His platform was very similar to that of Bill Green but went even further, supporting Medicaid-financed abortions and tighter restrictions on guns. He also managed to create a much larger campaign chest of about $1.2 million. Rosenbaum decided against trying for an automatic ballot spot through the convention process; a Republican of the Rockefeller mold, he did not believe he could attain the required 25% of the vote. Instead, Rosenbaum opted to petition his way onto the ballot.

J. Patrick Barrett, a businessman from Syracuse who was expected to join the race, dropped out on May 20 when he came to the conclusion that he could not obtain the necessary support at the state convention.

At the Republican convention, Pataki won the overwhelming support of the delegates present. Herbert London, the runner-up, fell short of the 25% showing that he needed to obtain a place on the party's primary ballot.

Primary
London, Galbraith and Green were all initially determined to petition to be on the primary ballot on September 13, but efforts were made to dissuade them from doing so.  In return for his support for Pataki, London was nominated for the position of Comptroller. This move allowed Pataki to secure much of London's support within both the Republican and Conservative parties. On May 31, Green withdrew from the race and endorsed Rosenbaum.

On September 13, Pataki defeated Rosenbaum in the Republican primary by a margin of 75.6–24.4%. Rosenbaum endorsed Pataki the next day.

Results

Conservative primary

Independence Party
Independence candidate:
 Richard M. Rosenbaum, former Chairman of the Republican Party of New York (Initial Nominee – Withdrew September 14 – Endorsed George Pataki)
 Tom Golisano, businessman (Nominated – Added to Ballot September 28)

Libertarian Party
The original Libertarian candidate was New York City radio personality Howard Stern, who announced his candidacy for governor on his nationally syndicated radio show on March 22, 1994. Stern ran on a platform of reinstating the death penalty, letting road crews work only at night, staggering highway tolls to prevent traffic jams, and vowing to resign from office as soon as these goals were accomplished. Stern won the party's nomination by a two-thirds majority on the first ballot at their state convention on April 23, 1994.

Stern refused to file the financial disclosures required by law of any party seeking to hold public office. He filed suit against the state of New York, arguing that the applicable law violated his right to privacy and freedom of association. When the court denied his petition for an injunction, Stern called a press conference on August 4, 1994 and withdrew from the race. Robert L. Schulz, a political activist from Queensbury, New York, replaced Stern on the statewide ballot. Stern's running mate, Stan Dworkin of Westchester County, remained on the slate as candidate for lieutenant governor.

General campaign
Though early on in the election Cuomo led by as much as ten points, Pataki was eventually able to tie him due to his difficulty in defending his record. Pataki promised to cut income taxes by 25 percent which appealed to voters in an economic downturn.

One key issue in the election was capital punishment. Cuomo had long been a staunch opponent of the death penalty while Pataki supported it. In the 1980s and early 1990s most New Yorkers supported capital punishment due to high crime rates. Republican ads pointed to the case of Arthur Shawcross, a multiple murderer convicted of manslaughter who was paroled by New York in 1987 and committed additional murders while on release (during the time Cuomo was governor). This revelation caused a significant loss of support for Cuomo.

Polling

Results
While the race was very close overall, Pataki won by running up huge margins outside of New York City. Cuomo won only one county outside of the Five Boroughs, Albany County.

New York City Results

Rest of State Results

See also 
 Governorship of George Pataki

References

1994
Gubernatorial
New York